The Star was an English language daily evening newspaper in Ceylon published by Independent Newspapers Limited, part of M. D. Gunasena & Company. It was founded on 1967 and was published from Colombo. In 1967 it had an average net sales of 4,000.

References

1967 establishments in Ceylon
Defunct daily newspapers published in Sri Lanka
Defunct evening newspapers published in Sri Lanka
Defunct English-language newspapers published in Sri Lanka
Independent Newspapers Limited
Publications established in 1967